Children's Hour is a BBC radio programme.

The Children's Hour may refer to:

Games
 The Children's Hour (game), a game box containing three games (ABC Fishing, Peanut the Elephant, and Porky the Pig) for children released by Parker Bros in 1961.

Literature
 "The Children's Hour" (poem), a poem by Henry Wadsworth Longfellow, published in The Atlantic Monthly in September 1860
 The Children's Hour, a 16-volume set of books containing stories appropriate for children and youths, published in 1953 and edited by Marjorie Barrows.
 The Children's Hour, a novelette by Jerry Pournelle and S.M. Stirling, part of the Man-Kzin Wars series
 The Children's Hour, a novel, part of the Man-Kzin Wars series, an expansion of the novelette.
 The Children's Hour (Australian magazine), published by S.A. Education Department
 The Children's Hour (magazine), a children's magazine published by T. S. Arthur & Son, Philadelphia in the 1870s.
 Arthur Mee's Children's Hour (1928), an anthology of poems, stories and pictures by Arthur Mee

Film, TV and theatre
 The Children's Hour (play), a 1934 stage play by Lillian Hellman.
 Its film adaptations, These Three (1936) starring Miriam Hopkins, Merle Oberon, Joel McCrea, and The Children's Hour (film) (1961), with Audrey Hepburn, Shirley MacLaine, and James Garner.

TV
 The Children's Hour (TV program), a long-running American children's television program that aired in Dallas, Texas from 1970 to 1992, hosted by Bill Kelley

Radio
 The Children's Hour (later known as just Children's Hour), a BBC radio programme for children, broadcast from 1922 until 1964
 The Children's Hour (Australian radio), an ABC program incorporating The Argonauts' Club.
 The Children's Hour (radio comedy), a BBC Radio 4 comedy programme
 The Horn and Hardart Children's Hour (later known as just The Children's Hour), a radio and, later, a television program of the 1920s-1950s

Music
"The Children's Hour", song for voice & piano, S. 227 (K. 6B38) Charles Ives